The Young Runaways may refer to:

 The Young Runaways (1968 film), an American teen drama film
 The Young Runaways (1978 film), an American made-for-television drama film